The men's light welterweight 64 kg boxing event at the 2019 European Games in Minsk was held from 23 to 30 June at the Uruchie Sports Palace.

Results
Legend
RSC — Won by referee stop contest

Final

Top half

Bottom half

References

External links
Draw Sheet

Men 64